The 4th Central Committee of the Lao People's Revolutionary Party (LPRP) was elected at the 4th LPRP National Congress in 1986. It was composed of 51 members and nine alternates.

Members

Alternates

References

Specific

Bibliography
Articles:
 

4th Central Committee of the Lao People's Revolutionary Party
1986 establishments in Laos
1991 disestablishments in Laos